Wassand railway station was a railway station that served the villages of Wassand and Goxhill in the East Riding of Yorkshire, England. It was on the Hull and Hornsea Railway.

It opened in 1865, and was originally named "Goxhill". It was renamed "Wassand" (to avoid confusion with Goxhill in Lincolnshire) on 1 October 1904, and closed on 21 September 1953.

References

External links
 Wassand station on navigable 1947 O. S. map

Disused railway stations in the East Riding of Yorkshire
Former North Eastern Railway (UK) stations
Railway stations in Great Britain opened in 1865
Railway stations in Great Britain closed in 1953
Hull and Hornsea Railway